The Playing Favorites is an American indie rock band, working as a side project of several punk rock band members. The band members are Joey Cape (Me First and the Gimme Gimmes, Lagwagon, Bad Astronaut), Luke Tierney (The Penfifteen Club, Silver Jet), Tim Cullen (Summercamp), Marko DeSantis (Sugarcult, Bad Astronaut, The Lapdancers) and Mick Flowers (Popsicko, The Rentals, The Lapdancers). The band originates from Santa Barbara, CA.

The band's debut album, I Remember When I Was Pretty, was released in 2007. The songs were recorded in a period of 5 days.

Discography

Studio albums

EP's

References

External links
 The Playing Favorites MySpace page
 Band page on Suburban Home Records website

Indie rock musical groups from California